Poddębice  is a town in central Poland, in Łódź Voivodeship, about 40 km northwest of Łódź. It is the capital of Poddębice County. Population is 7,245 (2020).

History 
Poddębice was a private town, administratively located in the Łęczyca Voivodeship in the Greater Poland Province of the Kingdom of Poland. Zygmunt Grudziński built a Renaissance palace in the town.

World War II
During the German occupation of Poland (World War II), in 1940, the occupiers carried out expulsions of Poles, mostly owners of shops, workshops and better houses, which were then handed over to German colonists as part of the Lebensraum policy. The local Jewish population, which numbered around 1,400 at the start of the war, was confined to a ghetto and subject to forced labor. In 1942, five were hung publicly and in April, 1,800 Jews, including several hundred forcibly resettled from Łęczyca, were confined in a church for ten days without any essentials, including food until a bribe was paid. Ten died there. After a few days, the sick and the elderly were then murdered nearby. After ten days, some skilled workers were sent to the Łódź Ghetto. All the remainder were sent to the Chełmno extermination camp where they were immediately gassed. Few of Poddębice's Jews survived the war. The German administrator of Poddębice (probably Franz Heinrich Bock) kept a secret diary published after the war. His diary was critical of the anti-Jewish policies. He had tried to help the Jewish population when he could. He was removed from his post during the war.

Sports
The local football club is Ner Poddębice. It competes in the lower leagues.

References

External links
 Official website

Cities and towns in Łódź Voivodeship
Poddębice County
Kalisz Governorate
Łódź Voivodeship (1919–1939)